Jackson County Courthouse may refer to:

 Jackson County Courthouse (Arkansas), Newport, Arkansas
 Jackson County Courthouse (Georgia), Jefferson, Georgia
 Jackson County Courthouse (Florida), Marianna, Florida
 Jackson County Courthouse (Illinois), Murphysboro, Illinois
 Jackson County Courthouse (Indiana), Brownstown, Indiana
 Jackson County Courthouse (Bellevue, Iowa)
 Jackson County Courthouse (Maquoketa, Iowa)
 Jackson County Courthouse (Kansas), Holton, Kansas
 Jackson County Courthouse (Minnesota), Jackson, Minnesota
 Jackson County Courthouse (Independence, Missouri)
 Jackson County Courthouse (Kansas City, Missouri)
 Jackson County Courthouse (North Carolina), Sylva, North Carolina
 Jackson County Courthouse (Oklahoma), Altus, Oklahoma
 Jackson County Courthouse (Jacksonville, Oregon)
 Jackson County Courthouse (Medford, Oregon)
 Jackson County Courthouse (Texas), Edna, Texas, site of the Jackson County Monument